Risto is a masculine given name, found in Finnish, Estonian and South Slavic. In South Slavic, it is a hypocorism derived from Hristofor or Hristivoje. It may refer to:

Estonia 
Risto Järv (born 1971), folklorist
Risto Joost (born 1980), conductor and operatic countertenor
Risto Kallaste (born 1971), footballer
Risto Kappet (born 1994), sim racing driver
Risto Kask (born 1985), civil servant and politician
Risto Kübar (born 1983), actor
Risto Lumi (born 1971), military colonel
Risto Mätas (born 1984), javelin thrower

Finland
Risto Aaltonen (1939–2021), actor
Risto Ahti (born 1943), writer and recipient of the Eino Leino Prize in 1994
Risto Alapuro (1944–2022), sociologist
Risto Ankio (born 1937), athlete
Risto Asikainen (born 1958), record producer, songwriter and musician
Risto Björlin (born 1944), wrestler
Risto Dufva (born 1963), former professional ice hockey goaltender
Risto Hurme (born 1950), modern pentathlete and fencer (1966)
Risto Ihamuotila (born 1938), retired academic and ex-Chancellor of the University of Helsinki
Risto Isomäki (born 1961), environmental activist and author of science fiction and nonfiction books
Risto Jalo (born 1962), retired professional ice hockey player
Risto Jarva (1934–1977), filmmaker
Risto Jussilainen (born 1975), ski jumper
Risto Kala (1941–2021), basketball player
Risto Kalliorinne (born 1971), politician in the Parliament of Finland
Risto Kaskilahti (born 1963), actor
Risto Kiiskinen (born 1956), cross-country skier
Risto Korhonen (born 1986), former professional ice hockey defenceman
Risto Kuntsi (1912–1964), shot putter who won a silver medal at the 1934 European Championships
Risto Laakkonen (born 1967), ski jumper who competed from 1986 to 1993
Risto Lamppu (1924–1995), field hockey player
Risto Lauriala (born 1949), classical pianist
Risto Luukkonen (1931–1967), boxer
Risto-Veikko Luukkonen (1902–1972), architect
Risto Mannisenmäki (born 1959), former rally co-driver, twice world champion with driver Tommi Mäkinen
Risto Mattila (born 1981), snowboarder
Risto Mattila (athlete) (1909–1990), sprinter
Risto Meronen (born 1945), boxer
Risto Miikkulainen, Finnish-American computer scientist, professor at the University of Texas at Austin
Risto Mustonen (1875–1941), wrestler
Risto Näätänen (born 1939), psychologist and neuroscientist, Professor in University of Helsinki 1975–1999
Risto Nuuros, orienteering competitor, silver medalist at the 1978 World Orienteering Championships in Kongsberg
Risto Orko (1899–2001), film producer and director
Risto Penttilä (born 1959), former member of the Finnish parliament, Director of the Finnish Business and Policy Forum
Risto Punkka (1957–2014), biathlete
Risto Puustinen (born 1959), football manager and a former footballer
Risto Rasa (born 1954), poet
Risto Rosendahl (born 1979), speed skater
Risto Ryti (1889–1956), fifth President of Finland from 1940 to 1944
Risto Siilasmaa (born 1966), the chairman, founder and former CEO of F-Secure Corporation (anti-virus and computer security software)
Risto Siltanen (born 1958), retired professional ice hockey defenceman
Risto Solanko (1901–1980), diplomat
Risto Soramies (born 1946), bishop of the Evangelical Lutheran Mission Diocese of Finland
Risto Syrjänen (1925–2016), hurdler
Risto Talosela (1924–2018), wrestler
Risto Ulmala (born 1963), former long-distance runner

Macedonia 
Risto Apostolov, songwriter, composer, and music producer
Risto Arnaudovski (born 1981), retired handball player
Risto Bimbiloski (born 1975), fashion designer
Risto Božinov, footballer
Risto Duganov (born 1975), former professional basketball Small forward
Risto Gjorgjiev, Director of Military Service for Security and Intelligence
Risto Jankov (born 1998), footballer
Risto Kirjazovski (1927–2002), historian, scientist and publisher
Risto Krle (1900–1975), playwright
Risto Milosavov (born 1965), footballer
Risto Mitrevski (born 1991), professional footballer
Risto Samardžiev (born 1964), singer and songwriter

Montenegro 
Risto Lakić (born 1983), football defender
Risto Radovićo (1938–2020), bishop of the Serbian Orthodox Church, theologian, university professor, author, translator
Risto Radunović (born 1992), professional footballer
Risto Ratković (1903–1954), avant-garde (Surrealist) writer and diplomat
Risto Stijović (1894–1974), sculptor

Serbia 
Risto Ristović, footballer
Risto Stijović, sculptor
Risto Vidaković, retired footballer

Other nationalities 
Risto Darlev (born 1954), Yugoslav former wrestler
Risto Mejide (born 1975), Spanish publicist, author, music producer and songwriter, judge on the television show Operación Triunfo
Risto Savin, Slovenian composer
Risto Siliqi (1882–1936), Albanian poet, publicist, lawyer, and militant of the Albanian national cause

Fictional characters 
Risto Reipas, Finnish translation for Christopher Robin
Risto Räppääjä or Ricky Rapper, main character in Finnish children's fantasy books and comic strips by Sinikka Nopola and Tiina Nopola

Other uses
 Risto (film), 2011 Finnish film
Risto, a Finnish pop rock band (refer to :fi:Risto (yhtye))

See also
Ristović

References

Estonian masculine given names
Finnish masculine given names
Macedonian masculine given names
Serbian masculine given names
Montenegrin masculine given names